Madhurika Patkar is an Indian  table-tennis player.

She beat serial winner Poulomi Ghatak in Manesar to win the 78th 11Even Sports Senior National and Inter-State Table Tennis Championship in 2016.

In February 2017 Patkar won the Indian national Table Tennis championship in the Women's Singles.

She was a part of Indian trio who defeated Singapore in 2018 Commonwealth Games at Gold Coast and won a gold medal for India.

References 

1987 births
Living people
Indian female table tennis players
Table tennis players at the 2018 Commonwealth Games
Commonwealth Games medallists in table tennis
Commonwealth Games gold medallists for India
Table tennis players at the 2010 Asian Games
Table tennis players at the 2014 Asian Games
Table tennis players at the 2018 Asian Games
Asian Games competitors for India
Recipients of the Arjuna Award
Medallists at the 2018 Commonwealth Games
South Asian Games gold medalists for India
South Asian Games medalists in table tennis